This page is a list of the owners and executives of the Boston Red Sox.

The Boston Red Sox are an American professional baseball team based in Boston, Massachusetts. The Red Sox compete in Major League Baseball (MLB) as a member club of the American League (AL) East division.

Owners

Majority owners

 During the ownership tenure of Mrs. Jean R. Yawkey, Haywood Sullivan and Buddy LeRoux became general partners. A purchase of the team from the estate of Tom Yawkey was approved by the league in May 1978, resulting in each of Mrs. Yawkey, Sullivan, and LeRoux having a one-third controlling interest in the team as general partners. This stood until March 1987, when Yawkey bought out LeRoux, following a failed attempt by LeRoux to take control of the team. Mrs. Yawkey's majority ownership of the team passed upon her death in February 1992 to JRY Trust, which later bought out Sullivan in November 1993.

Minority owners

Eddie Collins
Thomas R. DiBenedetto
Robert Drury
John A. Kaneb
Seth Klarman
Buddy LeRoux
Larry Lucchino
George J. Mitchell
Phillip H. Morse
Les Otten
Frank Resnek
Samuel A. Tamposi
Haywood Sullivan
Jeffrey Vinik
Tom Werner
LeBron James

Executives

Team presidents

Source:

Heads of baseball operations
The team has used different titles for the person superior to a general manager.

Source:

General Managers

Other executives

John Alevizos
Allard Baird
Dick Bresciani
Josh Byrnes
John Claiborne
George J. Digby
Billy Evans
David Howard
Bill James
Eddie Kasko
Edward F. Kenney, Sr.
Bill Lajoie
Neil Mahoney
Johnny Murphy
Herb Pennock
Bob Schaefer
Craig Shipley
Specs Toporcer

Notes

References

External links
Baseball America: Executive Database

 
 
Boston
owners and executives